Statistics of Úrvalsdeild in the 1989 season.

Overview
It was contested by 10 teams, and KA won the championship. FH's Hörður Magnússon was the top scorer with 12 goals.

League standings

Results
Each team played every opponent once home and away for a total of 18 matches.

References

Úrvalsdeild karla (football) seasons
Iceland
Iceland
1